Dummies and decoys are fake military equipment that are intended to deceive the enemy.  Dummies and decoys are only one aspect of military deception.

Examples
During World War II, dummy airfields and even towns were used in England to divert German bombers from the real targets. At the Battle of La Ciotat in 1944, American aircraft dropped hundreds of dummy paratroopers (paradummies) just north of La Ciotat, France. The goal of this operation was to divert German troops away from the main landing zones of Operation Dragoon. Additionally, during World War II, Operation Quicksilver was an attempt to mislead the Germans as to the location of the D-Day invasion using dummy military equipment.

A naval example was the British battleship HMS Centurion. Obsolete and disarmed by World War II, she spent two years in the Mediterranean fitted with wooden guns, to make British naval forces in the area seem stronger than they were. Likewise, Fleet tender was the codename for a number of British merchant ships that fitted with dummy structures to resemble warships.

In Russia, a former hot air balloon factory has continued in the 2010s to make dummy tanks, aircraft, missile launch pads, radar stations, and rocket launchers.  The inflatable dummies are designed to present a realistic image to enemy radar and thermal imaging.

During the Russian invasion of Ukraine, AFU successfully used wooden dummies of HIMARS in order to divert Russian missile strikes.

An intercontinental ballistic missile may release decoys in addition to one or more warheads.

Military aircraft on SEAD missions may carry decoy missiles such as the MALD which can create aircraft-like return signals on enemy radars.

See also
Dummy round
Dummy tank
Maskirovka
Q-ship
Quaker gun
Rubber duck
Victor Jones

References 

Decoys
Military deception
Military use of mimicry